Michael Drelich (August 20, 1953 – November 2, 2016), better known by the stage name Max Alexander, was an American stand-up comedian and actor who appeared numerous times on The Tonight Show.

Biography

Career
Born on August 20, 1953 on the East Coast, he moved to Los Angeles in his late twenties. In addition to doing stand-up comedy, Alexander also began appearing in supporting appearances on many sitcoms (Full House) and other series (Matlock). Alexander's film credits include supporting roles with stars such as Tom Hanks, Steve Martin, Jim Carrey, and Jason Segel, in such films as Roxanne (1987), Punchline (1988), and Forgetting Sarah Marshall.

He also appeared in Comedy Central's Best of the Improv, Vol. 5 (2003) and Comedy Club Greats with Jerry Seinfeld (2007). In recent years Alexander was frequently in Las Vegas, performing his comedy alongside Tom Jones and others. His last film was Trainwreck (2015). He entertained at the 1989 wedding of Ann-Margret's son Lars, in Las Vegas,  He appeared on the Jerry Lewis MDA Telethon as well.

His stand-up routine focused primarily on his large size, constantly poking fun at his weight. He was known for pulling his pants up to his chest during his routines.

Personal life
In 2008, Alexander was hospitalized with a kidney ailment and needed a transplant to survive. His brother Rabbi Moshe Drelich was the one who donated it.  A few weeks after his transplant, Alexander suffered a stroke.

Alexander died on November 2, 2016, from a form of throat cancer.

Filmography

References

External links
 

1953 births
2016 deaths
American male comedians
American male film actors
American male television actors
20th-century American comedians
21st-century American comedians
Jewish American male comedians
Deaths from cancer in New York (state)
Deaths from throat cancer
21st-century American Jews